is a Japanese footballer currently playing as a midfielder for Vanraure Hachinohe.

Career statistics

Club
.

Notes

References

External links

1989 births
Living people
Japanese footballers
Association football midfielders
Ryutsu Keizai University alumni
Japan Football League players
J3 League players
Matsumoto Yamaga FC players
Fujieda MYFC players
ReinMeer Aomori players
Nara Club players
Vanraure Hachinohe players